Ostrearia is a monotypic genus of flowering plants belonging to the family Hamamelidaceae. The only species is Ostrearia australiana.

Its native range is Northeastern and Eastern Queensland.

References

Hamamelidaceae
Monotypic Saxifragales genera